Seniority was an  cargo ship which was built in 1942 as Empire Boswell for the Ministry of War Transport (MoWT). Postwar she was sold into merchant service as Aviswell and Seniority, serving until she ran aground on 7 November 1950. Although refloated, she sank on 8 November 1950.

Description
The ship was built by William Gray & Co. Ltd., West Hartlepool. She was yard number 738. Launched as Empire Boswell on 2 June 1942, she was completed in August 1942.

The engine was built by the Central Marine Engine Works, West Hartlepool.

Career

Empire Boswell's port of registry was West Hartlepool. She was initially operated under the management of Currie Line Ltd. She was a member of a number of convoys during the Second World War.

ON 160
Convoy ON 169 departed from the United Kingdom on 12 January 1943 and arrived at Ambrose on 5 February. Empire Boswell is noted as a straggler from this convoy.

SC 129
Convoy SC 129 departed from Halifax, Nova Scotia on 2 May 1943 and arrived at Liverpool on 21 May.

UGS 18
Convoy UGS 18 departed from the Hampton Roads, United States on 15 September 1943 and arrived at Port Said on 13 October. Empire Boswell joined the convoy at Gibraltar and left at Bône, Algeria.

In 1945, management of Empire Boswell was transferred to the British-India Steam Navigation Company. In 1947, Empire Boswell was sold to Aviation & Shipping Co Ltd and renamed Aviswell. She was operated under the management of Purvis Shipping Co Ltd.

In 1949, Aviswell was sold to F T Everard & Co Ltd and renamed Seniority. On 7 November 1950, Seniority ran aground at Leinish Point, Inner Hebrides. Although refloated, she sank the next day off the Bo Vich Chuan Rock.

Official Numbers and Code Letters

Official Numbers were a forerunner to IMO Numbers. The ship had the UK Official Number 168945. Empire Boswell used the Code Letters BCBP.

References

1942 ships
Ships built on the River Tees
Steamships of the United Kingdom
Ministry of War Transport ships
Empire ships
Merchant ships of the United Kingdom
Maritime incidents in 1950
Shipwrecks of Scotland